Coup is a social deduction card game designed by Rikki Tahta and published in 2012 by Indie Boards & Cards and La Mame Games. Players are given two cards and attempt to eliminate the other players by lying and calling their bluffs.

Gameplay 
Each player has two face-down character cards. Players take turns performing actions, while the other players have the opportunity to challenge or enact a counteraction. Some actions and counteractions require a player to claim to have a specific character card (which they can do regardless of whether or not they have it). Such claims can be challenged by anyone in the game, regardless of whether they are directly involved in the action. If a player is challenged, they must prove they had the played character card by revealing it from their face-down cards. If they can not or do not want to prove it, they lose the challenge, but if they can, the challenger loses. Whoever loses the challenge immediately loses one of their character cards.

Spin-offs and expansions

Coup: Rebellion Guatemala 1954 
A spin-off, Coup: Rebellion Guatemala 1954 (also known as Coup: Rebellion G54), was released in 2014, which included a variable deck of 25 characters. The rules and gameplay are the same as Coup (2012) but with different possible characters, of which five out of the 25 are chosen in each game. An expansion of this called Coup: Rebellion Guatemala 1954- Anarchy was released in 2016 which added seven new roles (Anarchists, Paramilitary, Arms Dealers, Freedom of press, World Bank, Plantation owners, and Socialists) and actions to the game.

Coup: Reformation 
In 2014, the game Coup: Reformation was also released by Rikki Tahta and La Mame Games. In this version, each player must declare themself as either Loyalist or Reformist and can target only members of the other faction. Conversion between factions is possible by paying a donation to the Almshouse (treasury). After the other faction has all been eliminated or converted, all remaining players within a faction descend into in-fighting, and the game proceeds as in Coup (2012).

Reception 
Upon its release, Coup received generally positive reviews. A review from The New York Times praised its simplicity, engagement, and replayability. Clayton Ashley from Polygon praised the game's simplicity and bluffing mechanism. Alex Walker, writing from Kotaku, complemented Coup: Rebellion for its ease of play, quick rounds, and mechanics. However, he also described that the game could "drag on over longer sessions" compared to the original. 

BoardGameGeek nominated the game for the 2013 Golden Geek award for Best Party Board Game and the 2013 Golden Geek award for Best Card Game.

References

External links 
 

Multi-player card games
Dedicated deck card games
Card games introduced in 2012
Works about coups d'état